Bertrand d'Eschaud, d'Echaux, Etchauz, or des Chaux (1556 or 1557, Saint-Étienne-de-Baïgorry - 21 May 1641) was a French cleric and politician. He was bishop of Bayonne (1599-1617), then archbishop of Tours (1617-1641). Prélat-commandeur du Saint-Esprit, Bertrand d'Eschaud was almoner to his kinsman Henry IV of France and then to Louis XIII of France, who promised him a cardinalate.

Bibliography
J. de Jaurgain, Revue de Béarn, Navarre et Lannes, t. III, 1885, p. 15.

1556 births
1641 deaths
Bishops of Bayonne
Archbishops of Tours